Figueira Pavão is a settlement in the southeastern part of the island of Fogo, Cape Verde. In 2010 its population was 320. It is situated 3 km southwest of Cova Figueira and 20 km east of the island capital São Filipe. Nearby settlements are Achada Furna to the west and Estância Roque to the north.

See also
List of villages and settlements in Cape Verde

References

Villages and settlements in Fogo, Cape Verde
Santa Catarina do Fogo